Rodrigo Rivera may refer to:

 Rodrigo Rivera Salazar (born 1963), Colombian politician
 Rodrigo Rivera (footballer, born 1983), Chilean football centre-back
 Rodrigo Rivera (footballer, born 1993), Salvadoran football midfielder

See also
Rodrigo Riera (1923–1999), Venezuelan guitarist and composer
Rodrigo Rivero (born 1995), Uruguayan football winger